Korean schools may refer to:
 Education in North Korea
 Education in South Korea
 Education in Korea (disambiguation)
 Chōsen gakkō - North Korean schools in Japan